A range of gemstones are mentioned in the Bible, particularly in the Old Testament and the Book of Revelation. Much has been written about the precise identification of these stones, although largely speculative.

History
The Hebrews obtained gemstones from the Middle East, India, and Egypt. At the time of the Exodus, the Bible states that the Israelites took gemstones with them (Book of Exodus, iii, 22; xii, 35-36). When they were settled in the Land of Israel, they obtained gemstones from the merchant caravans travelling from Babylonia or Persia to Egypt, and those from Saba and Raamah to Tyre (Book of Ezekiel, xxvii, 22). King Solomon even equipped a fleet which returned from Ophir, laden with gems (Books of Kings, x, 11).

Gemstones are mentioned in connection with the breastplate of the High Priest of Israel (Book of Exodus, xxviii, 17-20; xxxix, 10-13), the treasure of the King of Tyre (Book of Ezekiel, xxviii, 13), and the foundations of the New Jerusalem (Book of Tobit, xiii, 16-17, in the Greek text, and more fully, Book of Revelation, xxi, 18-21). The twelve stones of the breastplate and the two stones of the shoulder-ornaments were considered by the Jews to be the most
precious. Both Book of Ezekiel, xxviii, 13, and Book of Revelation, xxi, 18-21, are patterned after the model of the rational and further allude to the Twelve Tribes of Israel.

At the time of the Septuagint translation, the stones to which the Hebrew names apply could no longer be identified, and translators used various Greek words.  Josephus claimed he had seen the actual stones. The ancients did not classify their gemstones by analyzing their composition and crystalline forms: names were given in accordance with their colour, use or their country of origin. Therefore, stones of the same or nearly the same colour, but of different composition or crystalline form, bear identical names. Another problem is nomenclature; names having changed in the course of time: thus the ancient chrysolite is topaz, sapphire is lazuli, etc. However, we know most of the stones were precious in Egypt, Assyria, and Babylonia.

Alphabetical list
The list comprises comparative etymological origins and referential locations for each stone in the Bible.

Agate

Agate, Heb. shbw; Sept. achates; Vulg. achates (Ex., xxviii, 19; xxxix, 12, in Heb. and Vulg.; also Ezech., xxviii, 13, in Sept.). This is the second stone of the third row of the rational, where it likely represented the tribe of Asher. The etymological derivation of the Hebrew word is unclear, but the stone has generally been acknowledged to be the agate. The Hebraic derivation derives shbw from shbb "to flame"; it may also be related to Saba (shba). Caravans having brought the stone to Palestine. The Greek and Latin names are taken from the river Achates (the modern Dirillo), in Sicily, where this stone was first found (Theophrastus, "De lapid.", 38; Pliny, "Hist. nat.", XXXVII, liv).

The stone belongs to the silex family (chalcedony species) and is formed by deposits of
siliceous beds in hollows of rocks. This mode of formation results in the bands of various colours which it contains. Its conchoidal cleavage makes it susceptible to a highly polished state.

Various medicinal powers were attributed to this stone until far into the Middle Ages. Agate was supposed to void the toxicity of all poisons and counteract the infection of contagious diseases; if held in the hand or in the mouth, it was believed to alleviate fever. Within mythology, the eagle placed an agate in its nest to guard its young against the bite of venomous animals, and the red agate was credited with the power of sharpening vision.

At present, agate and onyx differ only in the manner in which the stone is cut: if it is cut to show the layers of colour, it is called agate; if cut parallel to the lines, onyx. Formerly, an agate that was banded with well-defined colours was the onyx. The banded agate is used for the manufacturing of cameos.

Amethyst

Amethyst, Heb. ahlmh; Sept. amethystos, also Apoc., xxi, 20. This is the twelfth and last stone of the foundation of the New Jerusalem. It is the third stone in the third row of the rational, representing the tribe of Issachar (Ex., xxviii, 19; xxxix, 12); the Septuagint enumerates it among the riches of the King of Tyre (Ezech., xxviii, 13). The Greek name alludes to the popular belief that amethyst prevented intoxication; as such, drinking vessels were made of amethyst for festivities, and carousers wore amulets made of it to counteract the action of wine. Abenesra and Kimchi explain the Hebrew ahlmh in an analogous manner, deriving it from hlm, to dream; hlm in its first meaning signifies "to be hard". A consensus exists regarding the accuracy of the translation among the various versions; Josephus (Ant. Jud., III, vii, 6) also has "amethyst"; the Targum of Onkelos and the Syriac Version have "calf's eye", indicating the colour.

The amethyst is a brilliant transparent stone of a purple colour and varies in shade from  violet purple to rose. There are two kinds of amethysts: the oriental amethyst, a species of sapphire that is very hard (cf. Heb.,hlm), and when colourless is almost indistinguishable from the diamond. The occidental amethyst is of the silex family and is different in composition from the oriental stone. But the identity of names is accounted for by the identity of colour. The occidental amethyst is easily engraved and is found in a variety of sizes. Its shape is different from the round pebble to the hexagonal, pyramid-capped crystal.

Beryl

Beryl, Heb. yhlm; Sept. beryllos; Vulg. beryllus occupied the third place of the second row and in the breastplate, and was understood to represent Nephtali (Ex., xxviii, 19; xxxix, 13). According to the Septuagint, it was the second of the fourth row, and third of the fourth according to the Vulgate. Ezech., xxviii, 13, mentions it in the third place, and it is also cited in the Greek text of Tob., xiii, 17; however, it is missing in the Vulgate. Apoc., xxi, 20, gives it as the eighth stone of the foundation of the New Jerusalem.

The etymological debate indicates a difference of opinion regarding the exact Hebrew correlative of this word. The best supported is yhlm, though shhm is also probable. shpht has also been suggested, but with little proof. Consequently, the Hebrew shpht must correspond to jasper, Gr. iaspis and Lat. jaspis. This mistaken idea probably arose from the supposition that the translated words originally occupied the same position in the original. Comparative analysis of the Greek and Latin translations demonstrates that this is not the case; in the Vulgate, jasper is in the same position as yshpht, whereas the Greek beryllos does not correspond to the Latin beryllus.

The same may have happened regarding the translation of the Hebrew into Greek, especially because the old manner of writing the two words yshlm and shlm might be easily confused. Josephus is not reliable in this instance as he most likely quoted from memory; the position of the words being at variance in his two lists (Bell. Jud., V, v, 7; Ant. Jud., III, vii).

Therefore, the ultimate analysis is limited to the two words yshlm and shlm. By comparing various texts of the Vulgate - the Greek is very inconsistent - we find that shlm
always translated to onyx. This alone seems sufficient to support the opinion that beryl corresponds to the Heb. yhlm. That beryl was among the stones of the rational appears beyond doubt because all translations mention it and with the etymology giving us no special help, by elimination; we come to the generally accepted conclusion that beryl and yhlm stand for each other.

Beryl is a stone composed of silica, alumina, and glucina with beryl and emerald being of the same species. The difference between beryl, aquamarine, and  emerald is determined by the colouring and the peculiar shade of each. Beryl, though sometimes colourless (not white), is usually of a light blue bordering on a yellowish green; emerald is more transparent and of a finer hue than beryl. Beryl is also black in colour.  As a gem, it is considered more beautiful, and therefore more expensive - aqua marine is a beautiful sea-green variety.

Emerald derives its colour from a small quantity of chromium oxide; beryl and aqua marine from a small quantity of iron oxide. Beryl occurs in the shape of either a pebble or of an hexagonal prism. It is found in metamorphic limestone, slate, mica schist, gneiss and granite. In ancient times it was mined in Upper Egypt and is still found in the mica slate of Mt. Zaborah. The largest beryls known have been found in Acworth and Grafton, New Hampshire, and in Royalston, Massachusetts, United States of America; one weighs 2900 lb. and measures 51 inches in length by 32 inches by 22.

According to John Aubrey in "Miscellanies" beryl has also been employed for mystical and cabalistic practices.

Carbuncle

Carbuncle, Heb., nopek; Sept. anthrax (Ex., xxviii, 18;
xxxix, 11; Ezech., xxviii, 13; omitted in Ezech., xxvii, 16); Vulg., carbunculus (Ex., xxviii, 18; xxxix, 11; Ezech., xxviii, 13), gemma (Ezech., xxvii, 16). The carbuncle was the first stone of the second row of the rational and it represented Juda, and is also the eighth stone mentioned of the riches of the King of Tyre (Ezech., xxviii, 13). An imported object, not a native product, (Ezech., xxvii, 16); it is perhaps the third stone of the foundation of the celestial city (Apoc., xxi, 19).

The ancient authors are not in accordance on the precise nature of the carbuncle stone. It  probably corresponded to the anthrax of Theophrastus (De lap., 18), the carbunculus of Pliny (Hist. nat., XXXVII, xxv), the charchedonius of Petronius, and the ardjouani of the Arabs. If so, it is a red glittering stone, probably the Oriental ruby, though the appellation may have been applied to a variety of other red gems. Theophrastus describes it as: "Its colour is red and of such a kind that when it is held against the sun it resembles a burning coal." This description fits well with the Oriental ruby. He also relates that the most perfect carbuncles were brought from Carthage, Marseilles, Egypt, and the neighbourhood of Siena.

Carbuncles were named differently according to their places of origin. Pliny (Hist. nat., XXXVII, xxv) cites the lithizontes, or Indian carbuncles, the amethystizontes, the colour of which resembled amethyst, and sitites. Carbuncle was therefore most probably a generic name which applied to several stones.

Carnelian

Carnelian, Heb. arm, to be red, especially "red blooded"; Sept. and Apoc. sardion; Vulg. sardius; the first stone of the breastplate (Ex., xxviii, 17; xxxix, 10) representing Ruben; also the first among the stones of the King of Tyre (Ezech., xxviii, 13); the sixth foundation stone of the celestial city (Apoc., xxi, 19). Also found in Noahs story is the unproven that the dove Noah sent down to the ground was actually a garnet used to light the ground.

The word sardion has sometimes been called sardonyx. This is a mistake, for the same word is equivalent to carnelian in Theophrastus (De lap., 55) and Pliny (Hist. nat., XXXVII, xxxi), who derive the name from that of the city of Sardes where, they claim, it was first found. The carnelian is a siliceous stone and a species of chalcedony. Its colour is a flesh-hued red, varying from the palest flesh-colour to a deep blood-red. It is of a conchoidal structure. Normally its colour is without clouds or veins; but sometimes delicate veins of extremely light red or white are found arranged much like the rings of an agate. Carnelian is used for rings and seals. The finest carnelians are found in the East Indies.

Chalcedony

Chalcedony, Apoc., xxi, 19, chalkedon; Vulg. chalcedonius, the third foundation stone of the celestial Jerusalem. The view that the writing chalkedon is an error and that it should be charkedon (the carbuncle) is not without some reason. However, the other eleven stones correspond to a stone in the rational and this is the only exception. The ancients very often confounded the names of these two stones. Chalcedony is a siliceous stone. Its name is supposed to derive from Chalcedon, in Bithynia, where the ancients obtained the stone from. It is a species of agate and bears various names according to its colour. Chalcedony is usually made up of concentric circles of various colours and the most valuable of these stones are found in the East Indies. The gem is used for rings, seals and, in the East; drinking vessels.

Chodchod
Chodchod, kdkd (Is., liv, 12; Ezech., xxvii, 16); Sept.iaspis (Is., liv, 12), chorchor (Ezech., xxvii, 16); Vulg.jaspis (Is., liv, 12), chodchod (Ezech., xvii, 16). This word is used only twice in the Bible. Chodchod is generally identified with the
Oriental ruby. The translation of the word in Is. both by the Septuagint and the Vulgate is jasper; in Ezech. the word is merely transliterated; the Greek chorchor is explained by considering how easy it is to mistake a resh for a daleth.

"What chodchod signifies", says St. Jerome, "I have until now not been able to find" (Comment. in Ezech., xxvii, 16, in P. L., XXV, 255). In Is. he follows the Septuagint and translates chodchod by jaspis. The word is probably derived from phyr, "to throw fire"; the stone was therefore brilliant and very likely red. This supposition is strengthened by the fact that the Arabic word kadzkadzat, evidently derived from the same stem as chodchod, designates a bright red. It was therefore a kind of ruby, likely the Oriental ruby, perhaps also the carbuncle (see above).

Chrysolite

Chrysolite, Heb. trshysh (Ex., xxviii, 20; xxxix, 13; Ezech., i, 16; x, 9; xxviii, 13; Cant., v, 14; Dan., x, 6); Sept., chrysolithos (Ex., xxviii, 20; xxxix, 13; Ezech., xxviii, 13); tharsis (Cant., v, 14; Dan., x, 6); tharseis (Ezech., 1, 16; x, 9); Vulg. chrysolithus (Ex., xxviii, 20; xxxix, 13; Ezech., x, 9; xxviii, 13; Dan., x, 6),
hyacinthus (Cant., v, 14); quasi visio maris (Ezech., i, 16); Apoc., xxi, 20, chrysolithos; Vulg. chrysolithus. This is the tenth stone of the rational, representing the tribe of Zebulun; it stands fourth in the enumeration of Ezech., xxviii, 13, and is given as the seventh foundation stone of the celestial city in Apoc., xxi, 20.

None of the Hebrew texts give any hint as to the nature of this stone. However, since the Septuagint repeatedly translates the Hebrew word by chrysolithos, except where it merely transliterates it, and in Ezech., x, 9, since, moreover, the Vulgate follows this translation with very few exceptions, and Aquila, Josephus, and St. Epiphanius agree in their rendering, it can be assumed that the chrysolite of the ancients equates to our topaz.

The word tharsis very likely points to the origin of the gem (Tarshish). The modern chrysolite is a green oblong hexagonal prism of unequal sides terminated by two triangular pyramids. Topaz, or ancient chrysolite, is an octangular prism of an orange-yellow colour; it is composed of alumina, silica, hydrofluoric acid, and iron. it is found in Ceylon, Arabia, and Egypt. Several species were reported to exist (Pliny, "Hist. nat.", XXXVII, xlv) and during the Middle Ages it was believed to possess the power of relieving anxiety at night, driving away devils and to be an excellent cure for eye diseases.

Chrysoprase

Chrysoprase, Greek chrysoprasos, the tenth foundation stone of the celestial Jerusalem (Apoc., xxi, 20). This is perhaps the agate of Ex., xxviii, 20, and xxxix, 13, since the chrysoprasus was not very well known among the ancients. It is a type of green agate, composed mostly of silica and a small percentage of nickel.

Coral

Coral, Heb. ramwt (Job, xxviii, 18; Prov., xxiv, 7; Ezech., xxvii, 16); Sept. meteora, ramoth; Vulg. excelsa, sericum. The Hebrew word seems to derive  from tas, "to be high", probably pertaining to a tree. Another possibility is that the name originates from a strange country, as did the coral itself. It is apparent that the ancient
versions have been prone to mis-interpretation. In one instance they even went so far as to
simply transliterate the Hebrew word.

In Ezech., xxvii, 16, coral is mentioned as one of the articles brought by the Syrians to Tyre. The Phoenicians mounted beads of coral on collars and garments. These corals were obtained by Babylonian pearl-flshers in the Red Sea and the Indian Ocean. The Hebrews apparently made very little use of this substance, and it is seldom mentioned in their writings. This also explains the difficulty experienced in scriptural translation.

Gesenius (Thesaurus, p. 1113) translates phnynys (Job, xxviii, 18; Prov., iii, 15; viii, 11; xx, 15; xxxi, 10; Lam., iv, 7) as "red coral". However, pearl has also been interpreted to be the meaning in these passages. The coral referred to in the Bible is the precious coral (corallium rubrum), the formation of which is well known. It is a calcareous secretion of certain polyps resulting in a tree-like formation. Presently coral is found in the Mediterranean, the northern coast of Africa furnishing the dark red, Sardinia the yellow or salmon-coloured, and the coast of Italy the rose-pink coral. One of the greatest coral-fisheries of the present day is Torre del Greco, near Naples.

Crystal

Crystal, Heb. ghbsh (Job, xxviii, 18), qrh (Ezech, i, 22): both words signify a glassy substance; Sept. gabis; Vulg. eminentia (Job, xxviii, 18); krystallos, crystallus (Ezech., i, 22). Crystal is a transparent mineral resembling glass, most probably a variety of quartz. Job places it in the same category with gold, onyx, sapphire, glass, coral, topaz, etc. The Targum renders the qrt of
Ezech. as "ice"; the other versions translate it as "crystal". Crystal is again mentioned in Apoc., iv, 6; xxi, 11; xxii, 1. In Ps. cxlvii, 17, and Ecclus., xliii, 22, there can be no question that ice is indicated. The word zkwkyh, Job, xxviii, 17, which can be translated as crystal, means glass.

Diamond

Diamond, Heb. shmyr; Sept. adamantinos; Vulg. adamas, adamantinus (Ezech., iii, 9; Zach., vii, 12; Jer, xvii 1). Whether or not this stone is really diamond cannot be established. Many passages in Holy Scriptures point to the qualities of diamond, in particular to its hardness (Ezech., iii, 9; Zach., vii, 12; Jer., xvii, 1). In the last citation
Jeremiah informs us of a diamond usage which is much the same as its usage today: "The sin of Juda is written with a pen of iron, with the point of a diamond". However, although diamond is used to engrave hard substances, other stones can serve the same purpose.

The Septuagint omits the passages of Ezech. and Zach., while the first five verses of Jer., xvii, are missing in the Cod. Vaticanus and Alexandrinus, but are found in the Complutensian edition and in the Syriac and Arabic Versions. Despite the qualities mentioned in the Bible, the stone referred to may be the limpid corindon, which exhibits the same qualities, and is used in India for the same purposes as the diamond.

Diamond was not very well known among the ancients; and if we add to this the etymological similarity between the words smiris, the Egyptian asmir, "emery", a species of corindon used to polish gemstones, and shmyr, the Hebrew word supposed to mean diamond; the conclusion to be drawn is that limpid corindon was intended.

Aben-Esra and Abarbanel translate yhlm as "diamond"; but yhlm was demonstrated above to be beryl. Diamond is made up of pure carbon, mostly of a white transparent colour, but sometimes tinted. White diamond is often regarded as the most precious because of its beauty and rarity.

Emerald

Emerald, Heb. brqm; Sept. smaragdos; Vulg. smaragdus; the third stone of the rational (Ex., xxviii, 17; xxxix, 10), representing the tribe of Levi; it is the ninth stone in Ezech., xxviii,13, and the fourth foundation stone of the celestial Jerusalem (Apoc., xxi, 19). The same stone is also mentioned in Tob., xiii, 16 (Vulg. 21); Jud., x, 21 (Vulg. 19); and in the Greek text of Ecclus., xxxii, 8, but there is no indication of it in the Manuscript B. of the Hebrew text, found in the Genizah of Cairo in 1896.

Practically all versions, including Josephus (Ant. Jud., III, vii, 5; Bell. Jud., V, v, 7) translate brhm as "emerald". The Hebrew root brq (to glitter"), from which it is probably derived, is agreed on by scholastic consensus. The word may also derive from the Sanskrit marakata which is certainly emerald nor is the Greek form smaragdos that different either. In Job, xiii, 21; Jud., x, 19; Ecclus., xxxii, 8; and Apoc., xxi, 19, the emerald is certainly the stone referred to. The word bphr also has sometimes been translated by smaragdus but this is a mistake as bphr signifies carbuncle.

Emerald is a green variety of beryl and is composed of silicate of alumina and glucina. Structurally, it is a hexagonal crystal with a brilliant reflecting green colour. The emerald is highly polished and is found in metamorphic rocks, granites, and mica schist. Many of the finest specimens have been found in Muzo, Bogota, South America but the ancients obtained the stone from Egypt and India.

Although claims have been made that the ancients knew nothing of the emerald - Pliny, Theophrastus and others clearly refute this even though the name may have been used possibly for other stones. In the Middle Ages miraculous healing powers were attributed to the emerald, among them; the power to preserve or heal visual problems.

Jacinth

Hyacinth, Greek hyakinthos; Vulg. hyacinthus (Apoc., xxi, 20); the eleventh stone of the foundation of the heavenly city. It is probably equated with Heb., the ligurius of Ex., xxviii, 19; xxxix, 12 (St. Epiphan., "De duodecim gemmis" in P. G., XLIII, 300). The stone referred to in Cant., v, 14, and called hyacinthus in the Vulgate is the Hebrew shoham, which has been shown above to be chrysolite. The exact nature of hyacinth cannot be determined as the name was applied to several stones of similar colours and most probably designated stones reminiscent of the hyacinth flower.

Hyacinth is a zircon of a crimson, red, or orange colour. It is harder than quartz and its cleavage is undulating and sometimes lamellated. Its form is that of an oblong quadrangular prism terminated on both ends by a quadrangular pyramid. It was allegedly used as a talisman against tempests.

Jasper

Jasper Heb.  יָשְׁפֵ֑ה yashpeh; Sept. iaspis; Vulg. jaspis; the twelfth stone of the breastplate (Ex., xxviii, 18; xxxix, 11), representing Benjamin. In the Greek and Latin texts it comes sixth, and so also in Ezech., xxviii, 13; in the Apocalypse it is the first (xxi, 19). Despite this difference of position jaspis is undoubtedly the yshphh of the Hebrew text. The gem is an anhydrate quartz composed of silica, alumina, and iron and there are jaspers of nearly every colour. It is a completely opaque stone of a conchoidal cleavage. It seems to have been obtained by the Jews from India and Egypt.

Ligurus

Ligurus, Heb. lshs; Sept. ligyrion; Vulg. ligurius; the first stone of the third row of the rational (Ex., xxviii, 19; xxxix, 12), representing Gad. It is missing in the Hebrew of Ezech., xxviii, 13, but present in the Greek. This stone is probably the same as hyacinth (St. Epiphan., loc. cit.). This traditional identification, is based upon
the remark that the twelve foundation stones of the celestial city in Apoc., xxi, 19-20, correspond to the twelve stones of the rational. This alone is enough to equate ligurus with hyacinth although it has been identified with tourmaline; though the latter view is rejected by most scholars.

Onyx

Onyx, Lat; Sept. onychion; Vulg. lapis onychinus; the eleventh stone of the breastplate in the Hebrew and the Vulgate (Ex., xxviii, 20; xxxix, 13), representing the tribe of Joseph. In the Sept. it is the twelfth stone and the fifth in Ezech., xxviii, 13, in the Heb., but the twelfth in the Greek; it is called sardonyx and comes in the fifth place in Apoc., xxi, 20.

The exact nature of this stone is disputed because the Greek word beryllos occurs instead of the Hebrew ??? thereby indicating beryl. However, this is not so (see Beryl above).
The Vulgate equates onyx with the Hebrew ???  and although this alone would be a very weak argument; there are other, stronger testimonies to the fact that the Hebrew word occurs frequently in Holy Scripture: (Gen., ii, 12; Ex., xxv, 7; xxv, 9, 27; I Par., xxxix, 2; etc.) and on each occasion, except Job, xxviii, 16, the gem is translated in the Vulgate by lapis onychinus (lapis sardonychus in Job, xxviii, 16).

The Greek is very inconsistent in its translation, rendering shhs differently in various texts; therefore in Gen., ii, 12, it is lithos prasinos, sardios in Ex. xxv, 7; xxxv, 9;
smaragdos in Ex., xxviii, 9; xxxv, 27; xxxix, 6; soam, a mere transcription of the Hebrew word in I Par., xxix, 2; and onyx in Job, xxviii, 16.

Other Greek translators are more consistent: Aquila has sardonyx and Symmachus and Theodotion have onyx. The paraphrase of Onkelos had burla, the Syriac berula, both of which evidently are the Greek beryllos; "beryl". Since the translations do not observe the same order as the Hebrew in enumerating the stones of the rational (see Beryl above), it is not mandatory to accept the Greek beryllos as the translation of shhm. Therefore, relying on the testimony of the various versions it can safely be assumed that onyx is the stone signified by shhm.

Onyx is a variety of quartz analogous to agate and other crypto-crystalline species. It is composed of different layers of variously coloured carnelian much like banded agate in structure, but the layers are in even or parallel planes. This makes it well adapted for the cutting of cameos and was much used by the ancients for that purpose. The colours of the best are perfectly well defined, and are either white and black, or white, brown, and
black. Some of the best specimens have been brought from India.

Pearl

Pearl. Although not a gemstone in the strictest sense, we can apply the word "stone" in a broader context similar to that of coral. It is comparatively certain that pearl (Greek
margarite, Vulg. margarita) was known among the Jews, at least after the time of Solomon, as it was among the Phoenicians. The exact etymology is uncertain, but the following have been suggested: ghbysh, which signified "crystal" (see above); phnynym, which Gesenius renders by "red coral"; dr, Esth., i, 6, which is translated in the Vulg. by lapis parius, "marble"; the Arabic dar also signifies "pearl", and therefore Furst also renders the Hebrew word.

In the New Testament we find pearl mentioned in Matt., xiii, 45, 46; I Tim., ii, 9; etc. Pearl is a concretion consisting chiefly of lime carbonate found in several bivalve molluscs, but especially in avicula margaritifera. Generally, it has a whitish blue hue, sometimes showing a tinge of pink; but there are also yellow pearls. This gem was considered the most precious of all among the ancients, and was obtained from the Red Sea,
the Indian Ocean, and the Persian Gulf.

Ruby

Ruby. This stone may have been either the carbuncle or the chodchod (see above). There is, however, a choice between the oriental ruby and the spinel ruby; but the words may have been used interchangeably for both. The former is extremely hard, almost as hard as diamond, and is obtained from Ceylon, India, and China. It is considered one of the most precious gems.

Sapphire

Sapphire, Heb. mghry Septuag. sappheiron; Vulg. sapphirus. Sapphire was the fifth stone of the rational (Ex., xxviii, 19; xxxix, 13), and represented the tribe of Issachar. It is the seventh stone in Ezech., xxviii, 14 (in the Hebrew text, for it occurs fifth in the Greek text); it is also the second foundation stone of the celestial Jerusalem (Apoc., xxi, 19).

The genuine sapphire is a beautiful blue hyaline corindon and is composed of nearly pure alumina, its colour resulting from the presence of iron oxide. The ancients also referred to lapis-lazuli as sapphire, which is likewise a blue stone, often speckled with shining
pyrites giving it the appearance of being sprinkled with gold dust. It is composed of silica, alumina, and alkali and is an opaque substance easily engraved. Debate still continues as to which stone is precisely referred to in the Bible. Both may be meant, but lapis-lazuli seems more probable as its qualities are better suited for the purposes of engraving (Lam., iv, 7; Ex., xxviii, 17; xxxix, 13). Sapphire was obtained from India.

Sard
Sard and sardonyx are often confused by interpreters. Sard is carnelian, while sardonyx is a species of onyx.

Sardonyx
Sardonyx has a structure similar to onyx, but is usually composed of alternate layers of white chalcedony and carnelian, although carnelian may be associated with layers of white, brown, and black chalcedony. The ancients obtained onyx from Arabia, Egypt, and India.

Topaz

Topaz, Heb. ghtrh; Sept. topazion; Vulg. topazius, the second stone of the rational (Ex., xxviii, 17; xxxix, 19), representing Simeon; also the second stone in Ezech., xxviii, 13; the ninth foundation stone of the celestial Jerusalem (Apoc., xxi, 20) and also mentioned in Job, xxviii, 19.

This topaz is generally believed to have been chrysolite rather than the more generally known topaz. Oriental topaz is composed of nearly pure alumina, silica, and fluoric acid; its shape is an orthorhombic prism with a cleavage transverse to its long axis. It is extremely hard and has a double refraction. When rubbed or heated it becomes highly electric.

It varies in colour according to the country of origin. Australian topaz is green or yellow; the Tasmanian clear, bright, and transparent; the Saxon pale violet; the Bohemian sea-green and the Brazilian red, varying from a pale red to a deep carmine. The ancients very probably obtained it from the East.

See also
 Priestly breastplate

References

Further reading
Attribution
  The entry cites:
ST. EPIPHANIUS, De duodecim qemmis in Patrologia Graeca, XLIII, 294-304;
ST. ISIDORE, De lapidibus in Etymol., xvi, 6-15, in Patrologia Latina, LXXXII, 570-580;
Charles William King, Antique Gems (2d ed., London, 1872);
—, The Natural History of Gems or Decorative Stones (2d ed., London, 1870);
BRAUN, Vestitus sacerdotum hebræorum (Leyden, 1680);
BABELON in DAREMBERG AND SAGLIO, Dict. des antiquités grecques et romaines, s.v. Gemmæ;
LESÉTRE in VIGOUROUX, Dict. de la Bible, s.v. Pierres précieuses;
ROSENMÜLLER, Handbuch der biblischen Alterthumskunde (Leipzig);
WINER in Biblisches Realwörterbuch (Leipzig, 1847), s.v. Edelstine.

Biblical topics
Gemstones in religion